The Northeast Snowfall Impact Scale (NESIS) is a scale used to categorize winter storms in the Northeast United States. The scale was developed by meteorologists Paul Kocin and Louis Uccellini, and ranks snowstorms from Category 1 ("notable") to Category 5 ("extreme"). Only two historical blizzards, the 1993 Storm of the Century and the North American blizzard of 1996 are rated in the 5 "extreme" category. The scale differs from the Saffir–Simpson Hurricane Scale and Fujita Scale, which are used to classify tropical cyclones and tornadoes, respectively, in that it takes into account the number of people affected by the storm. The scale, as devised, is intended chiefly to assess past storms rather than assist in forecasts.

List

There are two available values for NESIS. The original values that Paul Kocin and Louis Uccellini computed for storms in their original 2004 work "A Snowfall Impact Scale Derived From Northeast Storm Snowfall Distributions" and the NESIS storm values recomputed using some different data and differing methods by the National Climatic Data Center (NCDC) in 2005 to productionize their work for assigning values to future storm storms beyond Kocin/Uccellini work. Kocin/Uccellini originally computed NESIS values for 70 storms from 1888 to 2003. The NCDC recomputed NESIS values for 30 of the same storms and has since for newer storms beyond 2003. 

Storms pre-2005 use the Kocin/Uccellini rating and description. Storms 2005 and onward use the NCDC rating and description. NOAA's National Centers for Environmental Information publishes a list of storms with ratings and other information, starting with the March 1956 storm.

See also

Regional Snowfall Index
List of Regional Snowfall Index Category 5 winter storms
List of Regional Snowfall Index Category 4 winter storms
Saffir–Simpson Hurricane Scale
List of blizzards

Footnotes

References

Development of an Operational Northeast Snowfall Impact Scale by Michael F. Squires and Jay H. Lawrimore

External links
 The original Kocin/Uccellini NESIS work
 A paper explaining differences between the original Kocin/Uccellini and the NCDC NESIS values for the same storm

Climate of the United States